Bharat Chawda is an Indian television actor. He is best known for playing the role of Bobby Sood as Shraddha's husband in TV serial Meri Bhabhi on STAR Plus.

Career
Bharat started his career as contestants in season 1 of Zee Cine stars ki Khoj in 2004 and then with Kahaani Ghar Ghar Kii as Ishaan on Star Plus, He also appeared in various shows Crime Patrol, Haunted Nights, Savdhaan India @ 11 & Fear Files: Darr Ki Sacchi Tasvirein he played the role in Meri Bhabhi as bobby on STAR Plus.

Television

Movies

References

External links
 

Living people
Indian male television actors
Indian male soap opera actors
Male actors from Mumbai
Indian male film actors
21st-century Indian male actors
1988 births